The Spectrum S-40 Freedom was a business jet developed by Spectrum Aeronautical. The aircraft was first announced at the 2006 NBAA Conference in Orlando, Florida.

Design and development

It will be built using a graphite-epoxy construction process that makes the aircraft one third the weight of comparably sized aluminium airplanes.

The retail sales price of the aircraft is supposed to be US-$6.8 million. In May 2011 Spectrum president Austin Blue is quoted: "We are still trying to get the programmes advancing, but it is not easy" The aircraft is to be released about 12 months before the smaller Spectrum S-33 Independence. FAA and JAA Type Certifications of the S-40 Freedom were initially estimated for 2010.

In 2016, the company stated that it was looking for funding to produce the S-40 in Mexico.

Specifications

See also

References

External links
 Spectrum Aeronautical

S-40
Abandoned civil aircraft projects
Very light jets